Hugh T Lambie (3 September 1917 – 26 December 2012) was an Australian rower. He competed in the men's coxed four event at the 1948 Summer Olympics.

References

1917 births
2012 deaths
Australian male rowers
Olympic rowers of Australia
Rowers at the 1948 Summer Olympics
Rowers from Melbourne
20th-century Australian people